Nonila "Noni" Wharemate (also known as Noni Martin; born 17 January 1982 in Hamilton, Waikato) is a member of New Zealand's women's basketball team at the Beijing Olympics in 2008.  She also played on New Zealand's Commonwealth Games Women's basketball team in 2006 and on New Zealand's team at the 2004 Olympics.

Wharemate is a member of the Christchurch Sirens.  She was named New Zealand's women's basketball defensive player of the year in 2001.  She played college basketball at the University of Texas at El Paso.

On 12 December 2014, Wharemate signed with the Joondalup Wolves for the 2015 SBL season.

Wharemate is a member of the Church of Jesus Christ of Latter-day Saints.

References

External links
Mormon Times article, 13 August 2008

1982 births
Living people
New Zealand women's basketball players
New Zealand Latter Day Saints
UTEP Miners women's basketball players
Olympic basketball players of New Zealand
Basketball players at the 2006 Commonwealth Games
Commonwealth Games silver medallists for New Zealand
Basketball players at the 2004 Summer Olympics
Basketball players at the 2008 Summer Olympics
Sportspeople from Hamilton, New Zealand
Commonwealth Games medallists in basketball
Medallists at the 2006 Commonwealth Games